Gilby is a surname. Notable people with the surname include:

Anthony Gilby (c.1510–1585), English clergyman
Fred Gilby (1907–1991), Australian rules footballer
Helen Gilby (born 1974), British sprint canoer
John Gilby (1900–1985), New Zealand rower

See also
Gilby Engineering, motor racing team